John McEnroe was the defending champion but lost in the semifinals to Boris Becker.

Ivan Lendl won in the final 6–4, 7–6 against Becker.

Seeds
A champion seed is indicated in bold text while text in italics indicates the round in which that seed was eliminated.

  Ivan Lendl (champion)
  Boris Becker (final)
  Jimmy Connors (semifinals)
  John McEnroe (semifinals)
  Tim Mayotte (second round)
  Mikael Pernfors (third round)
  Brad Gilbert (quarterfinals)
  Paul Annacone (second round)
  Johan Kriek (second round)
  Jimmy Arias (first round)
  Matt Anger (first round)
  Robert Seguso (quarterfinals)
  Tim Wilkison (second round)
  David Pate (first round)
  Kevin Curren (third round)
  Ramesh Krishnan (second round)

Draw

Finals

Top half

Section 1

Section 2

Bottom half

Section 3

Section 4

References
 1986 Volvo International Draw

Singles